Events from the year 1025 in India.

Events
Chola invasion of Srivijaya.
Mahmud of Ghazni attacked Somnath.

References

 
 
Years of the 11th century in India